Lake of the Woods 37 is a First Nations reserve consisting of four islands within Lake of the Woods. It is one of the reserves of the Northwest Angle 37 First Nation.

It includes Burnt Rock Island, Windfall Island, Cyclone Island and Windigo Islands.

References

Anishinaabe reserves in Ontario
Communities in Kenora District